Republica is the debut studio album by English band Republica. It was first released in the United States on 30 July 1996 by RCA Records, then released in the United Kingdom on 5 October of that year by Deconstruction Records. Three singles were released from the album: "Bloke", "Ready to Go" and "Drop Dead Gorgeous", with the last two being hits.

Upon its release, Republica received generally positive reviews from music critics and was a commercial success. It peaked at number four on the UK Albums Chart. In the US, it reached number 153 on the Billboard 200 and was also successful in other countries, such as Germany and New Zealand.

A deluxe edition of the album was released on 28 February 2020 on Cherry Red Records.

Track listing

Deluxe edition
This was released on the 90/9 imprint of Cherry Red Records on 28 February 2020.

Personnel
Saffron – vocals
Tim Dorney – producer, keyboards
Johnny Male – producer, guitar
David Barbarossa – producer, drums
Ben Grosse – additional producer, programming
Dave Arch – piano
Paul Cartledge – guitar
Pete Davis – keyboards, programming
Jez Williams – guitar
Randy Jacobs – guitar
Grant Mohrman – guitar
Marlon Young – guitar
Sal Aiello – guitar
Ian Tregoning – mixing
Phil Dane – mixing
Jesus Beats – programming
John Vitale – programming, guitar
Mike Tuller – programming

Charts

Weekly charts

Year-end charts

Certifications and sales

References

External links
[ Republica] at AllMusic

1996 debut albums
RCA Records albums
Republica albums